This article documents statistics from the 2007 Rugby World Cup, held in France from 7 September to 20 October.

Team statistics
The following table shows the team's results in some categories. Two red cards were issued during the tournament.

Source: RugbyWorldCup.com

Player records

Most points
Note: ranked according to points then number of appearances

Key: Pos = position; Apps = appearances; Con = conversions; Pen = penalties; Drop = drop goals

Source: RugbyWorldCup.com

Most tries

Key: Pos = position; Apps = appearances

Discipline

Citing/bans
There was some controversy over post-match citings by IRB Citing Commissioners because of apparent inconsistencies between disciplinary sanctions.

Hat-tricks
Unless otherwise noted, players in this list scored a hat-trick of tries.

Stadiums

See also
 2011 Rugby World Cup statistics
 Records and statistics of the Rugby World Cup
 List of Rugby World Cup hat-tricks

External links
Rugby World Cup 2007 Tournament statistics
Rugby World Cup Stats 
Disciplinary Decisions

References

Statistics
Rugby union records and statistics